Astartea zephyra is a shrub endemic to Western Australia.

The shrub is found in the South West and southern Wheatbelt regions of Western Australia.

References

Eudicots of Western Australia
zephyra
Endemic flora of Western Australia
Plants described in 2013
Taxa named by Barbara Lynette Rye
Taxa named by Malcolm Eric Trudgen